João Victor Lucas Wesner (born 23 March 2000) is a Brazilian footballer who currently plays for Baniyas.

Career statistics

Club

Notes

References

External links

2000 births
Living people
Brazilian footballers
Association football defenders
UAE Pro League players
Esporte Clube Cruzeiro players
Baniyas Club players
Expatriate footballers in the United Arab Emirates
Brazilian expatriate sportspeople in the United Arab Emirates